Stefano Jantje Lilipaly (born 10 January 1990) is a professional footballer who plays as a winger and forward for Liga 1 club Borneo Samarinda. Born in the Netherlands, he plays for the Indonesia national team.

Club career 
Lilipaly played for Dutch amateur side RKSV DCG for three years before joining Eredivisie club AZ's academy in 2000. He moved to Utrecht the following year and progressed through their youth system. Lilipaly made his first team debut for Utrecht in a league game at VVV-Venlo in August 2011, and his first appearance in the starting eleven came in January 2012, where he scored the opening goal against PSV. He played five times for Utrecht before joining Eerste Divisie club Almere City on a free transfer in the summer of 2012.

Almere City
On 21 May 2012, Lilipaly joined Eerste Divise club Almere City on a two-year contract. during the 2012-13 season, Lilipaly helped his team finish 13th in the league with 22 appearances and 2 goals. He left the club at March 2014.

Consadole Sapporo
On 23 March 2014, Lilipaly signed for Japanese J2 League club, Consadole Sapporo. But with his new club, Lilipaly didn't make a single appearance, then he went back to the Netherlands.

Telstar
He was signed for Telstar to play in the Eerste Divisie. Lilipaly made his debut on 28 August 2015 in a match against Emmen, and Lilipaly scored his first goal for Telstar in the 68th minute against Emmen at the BUKO Stadium.

SC Cambuur
In January 2017 he joined and signed a contract with Cambuur. and he made his debut as late substitute against FC Utrecht in 2016–17 KNVB Cup. He made his first goal against Helmond Sport, 3 February 2017. At this match Lilipaly made 2 assists at 3–0 won against Helmond Sports. He left the club at August 2017 and move to Indonesia.

Bali United

2017 season
On 12 August 2017, he signed a contract with Indonesian Liga 1 club Bali United to play in 2017 Liga 1. On 13 August 2017, Lilipaly made his league debut for the club in a match against Madura United, coming on as a substitute for I Made Andhika Wijaya in the 78th minute. On 8 October 2017, Lilipaly made his first goal for the club with scored a brace in Liga 1, earning them a 6–1 win over Arema. On 16 October 2017, he scored in a 3–2 away lose over Persiba Balikpapan. On 6 November 2017, Lilipaly scored the only goal in the 95th minute, and it was the winner against PSM Makassar. He finished his first season in 2017 with 4 goals in 15 games.

2018 season
On 27 February 2018, he made his Asian debut for the club, coming on as a starter in a 2018 AFC Cup match against Philippines club Global in a 1–1 away draw. On 7 March 2018, Lilipaly scored his first AFC Cup goal for Bali United in the 74th minute of a 3–1 win against V.League 1 club Thanh Hóa. The goal he made was named the best goal in the third week of the 2018 AFC Cup, in a vote conducted by the Asian Football Confederation, Lilipaly's goal received the support of 31.446 voters or 83% of the vote.

On 24 March 2018, Lilipaly scored his first goal of the 2018 season, the opening goal against PSMS Medan in a 1–0 win in the Liga 1. He scored his second league goal for the club on 22 April 2018, opening the scoring in a 2–0 win against PS Barito Putera with a lob over goalkeeper Aditya Harlan. His form in May saw him score three further goals in loses against Sriwijaya (3–4), Mitra Kukar (3–1), and wins against Arema (1–0). Lilipaly finished the season with 12 goals in 22 games.

2019 season
On 13 April 2019, Lilipaly scored his first goal of the 2019 season for Bali United in a friendly match against Liga Futebol Timor-Leste club Boavista, which ended in a 4–1 win. On 18 April, he scored a brace for Bali United beat Persija Jakarta 2–1 in the first leg of 2018–19 Piala Indonesia quarter-final. On 26 July, Lilipaly scored his first league goal of the 2019 season, the opening goal against Persib Bandung in a 0–2 away win in the Liga 1. On 15 August, he scored another brace for Bali United in a 1–2 away win against TIRA-Persikabo, with the away win, Bali United is now in first place by collecting 31 points from 13 matches that have been played. Lilipaly scored in second half and give assists a opening goal by Melvin Platje in Bali United's 2–2 draw over Persipura Jayapura on 11 November. Lilipaly scored in second half and give another assists a goal by Ilija Spasojević in Bali United's 3–2 win over Persib Bandung on 28 November. 

He had a good season in this season with 30 appearances and 5 goals, while helping Bali United win the championship Liga 1 this season. On 2 December 2019, Bali United won the championship for the first time in their history, becoming the seventh club to win the Liga 1 after second placed Borneo draw to PSM, followed by a win in Semen Padang, giving Bali United a 17-point lead with only four games left.

2020 season
On 14 January 2020, Lilipaly scored his first goal of the 2020 season for Bali United in a 2020 AFC Champions League qualifying play-offs against five-time Singapore Premier League champions, Tampines Rovers, Lilipaly and the other new signing Sidik Saimima ensured a 5–3 win and Bali United through to preliminary round 2. On 6 March, Lilipaly scored his first league goal of the 2020 season, the opening goal against PS Barito Putera in a 1–2 away win in the Liga 1. Lilipaly finished the season with only one goal in 2 games, because the league was officially discontinued due to the COVID-19 pandemic.

2021–22 season: Final season with Bali United
Lilipaly has been a hot topic of discussion throughout the early part of this year. His contract expired on 31 December 2020. However, when the team started preparations on February 8, Lilipaly did not join. he is shown in training activities around the Jerman beach, Kuta, Bali, with Beto Gonçalves and Demerson. The activity is often uploaded by him through his personal Instagram account, On 12 March 2021, Bali United has finally officially announced the extension of Lilipaly's contract until the end of the season. On 18 September 2021, he started his match in the 2021–22 Liga 1 season for Bali United in a 2–2  draw over Persib Bandung, he coming as a substitute for Yabes Roni in the 85th minute. He played the full 90 minutes in the loss to Bhayangkara on 23 October, where he registered one assist and on 25 November, he played the full 90 minutes in the won to Persija Jakarta.

On 13 January 2022, Lilipaly scored his first league goal of the 2021–22 season, the opening goal against Persib Bandung in a 0–1 win in the Liga 1. His form in February saw him score four further goals in wins against Persikabo 1973 (0–3), Bhayangkara (0–3), Persipura Jayapura (4–1) and draw against PSM Makassar (2–2). On 31 March 2022, he scored in a 1–3 win over Persik Kediri. On 6 May 2021, Lilipaly officially did not renew his contract with Bali United for next season, this was because the team failed to agree on the contract value requested by him, so he chose to leave. He contributed with 119 appearances, 32 goals and 24 assists during with Bali United for five years in all competitions and he successfully brought his club to the title for the second time.

Borneo F.C. Samarinda
Lilipaly was signed for Borneo to play in Liga 1 in the 2022–23 season. Lilipaly made his Borneo debut in a pre-season 2022 Indonesia President's Cup against PS Barito Putera on 22 June 2022, he coming as a substitute for Arya Gerryan in the 83rd minute. Three days later, Lilipaly scored his first goal in the 2022 President's Cup for the team in a 1–2 victory over Persija Jakarta at Segiri Stadium. Three days later, Lilipaly scored a brace for the club in a 3–0 win over RANS Nusantara and scored in a 4–0 win over PSS Sleman on 11 July 2022. He has scored a total of 4 goals in this tournament, and also managed to bring the team to the final round, although in the final match lost to Arema.

On 24 July 2022, Lilipaly made his league debut in a 3–0 win over Arema at Segiri Stadium. He scored his first goal for the club on 7 August 2022 in a 4–1 winning match against Persib Bandung at Segiri Stadium. LIlipaly selected as the best player in the third week of the 2022–23 Liga 1. On 9 December, Lilipaly scored a brace in a 2–4 win against PSIS Semarang, the latter result saw Borneo Samarinda move to 3rd position in the league table. On 23 December, Lilipaly scored the opening goal in a 1–1 draw over PSM Makassar, and also scored the opening goal, scoring a penalty in a 3–1 win against Persikabo 1973 on 16 February 2023.

On 20 February 2023, Lilipaly scored the opening goal for the club, scoring a long range in a 1–1 draw with Persita Tangerang at Indomilk Arena. He continued his good form on 8 March with give assists a opening goal by Muhammad Sihran in a 3–1 win over Persija Jakarta, whilst also scored who made it 2–1 in the 80th minute.

International career 
Lilipaly represented the Netherlands at youth level, from the under-15s to under-18s. He was eligible to represent the Netherlands or Indonesia at full international level through his parents; his mother being Dutch and his father Indonesian. Lilipaly took the Indonesian citizenship oath in October 2011, to make him officially available for selection. He made his full international debut in August 2013 in a win 2–0 against the Philippines, when he made an assist for Greg Nwokolo.

Lilipaly scored his first international goal for Indonesia in a match against Singapore in the 2016 AFF Championship, which was a late and decisive goal that qualified Indonesia to the semi-finals alongside Thailand. Lilipaly also scored against Vietnam in the second leg semi-finals which sent Indonesia to the finals. He was also called up for the 2018 AFF Championship.

In May 2022, Lilipaly was called up by Shin Tae-yong for a friendly  match against Bangladesh, three years since last time playing for the national team. He was called up for the 2023 AFC Asian Cup qualification on Kuwait.

In March 2023, Lilipaly was called up again to the national team for two friendly matches against Burundi, replacing Egy Maulana who was injured.

Personal life 
Born in the Netherlands, Lilipaly represented his country of birth at youth level. Lilipaly made his debut for the Indonesia national team in 2013. His father is Indonesian of Moluccan descent, while his mother is Dutch.

Career statistics

Club

International

As of match played 11 June 2022. Indonesia score listed first, score column indicates score after each Lilipaly goal.

List of international goals scored by Stefano Lilipaly

Honours

Club
Jong FC Utrecht
 KNVB Reserve Cup: 2009–10

Bali United
 Liga 1: 2019, 2021-22

International 
Indonesia
AFF Championship runner-up: 2016

Individual
2016 AFF Championship: Best Eleven
 ASEAN Football Federation Best XI: 2017' Liga 1 Player of the Month: August 2022

References

 External links 
 
 Stefano Lilipaly at Voetbal International''
 
 

1990 births
Living people
Footballers from Arnhem
Indonesian footballers
Indonesia international footballers
Dutch footballers
Indo people
Indonesian people of Dutch descent
Dutch people of Indonesian descent
Dutch people of Moluccan descent
Association football midfielders
FC Utrecht players
Almere City FC players
SC Telstar players
SC Cambuur players
Eredivisie players
Eerste Divisie players
J2 League players
Indonesian expatriate sportspeople in Japan
Indonesian expatriate sportspeople in the Netherlands
Indonesian expatriate footballers
Naturalised citizens of Indonesia
Dutch emigrants to Indonesia
Hokkaido Consadole Sapporo players
Footballers at the 2018 Asian Games
Asian Games competitors for Indonesia
Liga 1 (Indonesia) players
Persija Jakarta players
Bali United F.C. players
Borneo F.C. players
Expatriate footballers in Japan
Expatriate footballers in the Netherlands